Gerard Nus Casanova (born 31 January 1985) is a Spanish UEFA Pro license football manager and former player who currently assistant manager of Greece national football team.

He has experience in working as manager on different continents (Africa, Asia, North America, Europe and, Australia/Oceania). 
After retiring as a player at a young age and completing a Sports Science Degree at INEFC Lleida, Nus started his coaching career at Liverpool's academy. After his first year, he was promoted to Rafael's Benitez coaching staff, ending the 2008–09 season in 2nd position of the English Premier League and advancing to the quarterfinals of FA cup and UEFA Champions League.  
After his experience in England, and with the end of Benitez's period in Liverpool, Nus decided to bring his talent to the K League with Chunnam Dragons, where he was appointed as Assistant Coach under the experienced Head Coach Hae Soung. During his year in South Korea, the club ended the league in 7th position and advanced to the quarterfinals of FA cup and Rush Cup.
Author of “Warm up in football: training sessions & matches”, Gerard Nus is known for his aggressive and modern attacking style of play. In addition, he has worked in Brighton & Hove Albion F.C. (English Premier League), Melbourne Heart (A-League), Ghana National Football Team  (Africa), Elche CF (La Liga), Rayo Vallecano of Madrid (La Liga Smartbank), Rayo OKC (NASL), Irtysh Pavlodar  (Kazakhastan Premier League) and AFC Eskilstuna (Allsvenskan– Swedish top tier).

Career
Nus’ passion for football started at the age of 14 when he worked as an assistant coach and coordinator at RCD Espanyol football camps. His desire to be involved in coaching grew and at the age of 16 he completed one year coaching course to get the Federation Football Coaching Level 1 (Spanish Federation). The following year he completed his Level 2 coaching certificate, increasing his chances of getting involved in higher level coaching. Moreover, Nus wanted to deepen his studies in football and sport, so he began a degree in Sports Science at the age of 18, which he completed four years later. It was at the age of 22 when Nus completed his Level 3 coaching certificate (equivalent to UEFA Pro licence) in Huesca (Spain).
Having played most of his career in one of the best football clubs in Catalonia, CF Reus Deportiu, Nus suffered a career-ending injury on his ankle, which allowed him to focus only in coaching. With only 21 years old, he was appointed as assistant coach at Club Gimnàstic de Tarragona under-19.

Liverpool
In 2007, Nus decided to move to England to work as a Youth Coach at the prestigious football academy of Liverpool F.C., with the main role of contributing to the development of talented players.
One year later, Nus was promoted to the first team coaching staff, where he worked under the guidance of Rafael Benítez. On 18 March 2009, the team registered a 4–0 victory over Real Madrid CF and a 4–1 victory over Manchester United FC, managed by Sir Alex Ferguson. The 2008–09 season was an unbelievable campaign for the “reds”, ending in 2nd position of the Premier League and advancing to the quarterfinals of FA cup and UEFA Champions League. 
During this experience, Nus had the opportunity to work with world-class players such as Steven Gerrard, Javier Mascherano, Fernando Torres, Xabi Alonso and Pepe Reina. Moreover, he also played an important role in the development of youngsters such as Daniel Pacheco, Mikel San José or Miki Roqué, who played in the development squad.
In 2010, coinciding with Benítez's departure, Nus was appointed as Assistant Coach at Jeonnam Dragons in the K-League (South Korea).

Chunnam Dragons
After three years in UK, Nus moved to Asia to work for Chunnam Dragons in the top-tier division of South Korea K League. He was appointed as the Assistant Coach of Jung Hae-seong, who previously worked as assistant coach of the South Korean National team. During the 2011-12 campaign, Nus was able to develop players such as Ji Dong-won, who later signed with Sunderland AFC, and Yun Suk-Young, who signed for Queen Park Rangers.

In addition, the club ended the league in a historical 7th position and advanced to the quarterfinals of FA cup and Rush Cup. After this season, Nus decided to not renew his contract with the club. Nus came back to Spain to introduce his first-ever book, named “Warm up in football: training sessions & matches”, which was translated in three different languages: Spanish, English and South Korean, and can be found online.

The book covers the theory and practical side of warm up, with more than fifty suggested exercises and activities to be carried out at the start of training sessions, as well as 20 warm ups used by elite football teams, along with analysis and statistics. It aims to encourage and contribute ideas related to a fundamental part of sports performance. Furthermore, the prologue of the book was written by Rafael Benitez. The book's presentation took place in his hometown, Reus.

Brighton & Hove Albion
The following season (2012–13), Nus was appointed as Head of Academy Coaching at Brighton & Hove Albion F.C., where he oversaw the development of the club's youngest talent and played a big role in the process of promoting players to the first team, which was managed by the Uruguayan, Gustavo Poyet. Nus was not the only Spaniard member of the club, he also coincided with former Valencia CF right-back Bruno Saltor, talented midfielder Andrea Orlandi, attacking winger Vicente Rodríguez, defender Iñigo Calderón and skillful David López. In addition, during the 2012-13 campaign, the club experienced one of the most successful seasons of its history; finishing the league in 4th position and making it to the Championship playoff for the first time since 1991. The team was eliminated by their rivals Crystal Palace. Also, the club was knocked out of FA Cup in the fourth round, after losing 3–2 against Arsenal FC.
At Brighton & Hove Albion F.C., Nus focused his attention to transmit the attractive style of play implemented by the first team, to the rest of the teams of the academy. He worked diligently with Poyet's coaching staff to guarantee the growth of all the coaches of the club. He operated closely with all the academy players from the under-9 team to the under-21 team. The result of his work was observed as the club promoted multiple young players to the first team.

Melbourne Heart
In 2013, Nus decided to join John Aloisi's coaching staff at Melbourne Heart – currently named Melbourne City, owned by the City Football Group. Nus’ integration to the A-League was facilitated by his relationship with Aloisi, who previously played in two La Liga teams, CA Osasuna and Deportivo Alaves.
The 2013–14 season did not start upright for Melbourne Heart, and on 28 December 2013, Aloisi was sacked as the team manager after having played only 10 games. Technical director, John Van’t Schip took charge of the team and Nus was automatically promoted to first assistant coach. Under their guidance, the club developed a reputation for attacking and high-scoring football. On 23 January 2014, it was announced that the City Football Group had acquired Melbourne Heart for $12 million. In addition, the team obtained Spanish World Cup-winning striker, David Villa.
At the conclusion of the campaign, Nus rejected the club's offer to renew his contract, ending his time in Australia. A few months later, Nus developed a coaching software named “Efficiency Match Sports”, a sports app that allows coaches, scouts and technical directors, to create animations, training sessions, control teams, manage rosters, take notes and statistics from live games. Currently the app is being used all over the world in all the major leagues, academies and national teams.

Ghana national team
In December 2014, Nus was appointed as Assistant Coach at the Ghana Football Association with the main goal to prepare the 2015 Africa Cup of Nations, the 30th staging organized by the Confederation of African Football (CAF). The tournament - 17 January to 8 February 2015 - initially scheduled to be hosted by Morocco who later demanded postponement of the event because of the Ebola virus epidemic in West Africa; Morocco was ruled out as a host country and replaced by Equatorial Guinea.
The finals draw was held on 3 December 2014 in Malabo. The 16 teams were divided into four pots based on the CAF Ranking. The ranking was calculated using teams’ results in the 2015 Africa Cup of Nations qualifiers, 2013 Africa Cup of Nations finals and qualifiers, the 2012 Africa Cup of Nations finals and qualifiers, the 2010 Africa Cup of Nations finals, and the 2014 FIFA World Cup qualifiers. The Black Stars were placed into Group C with Algeria, Senegal and South Africa; all the games but one were played in Estadio de Mongomo.

The Ghanaian final squad was announced on 7 January 2015, with numerous players coming from Premier League, Serie A and Ligue 1 rosters. Jordan Ayew, Christian Atsu, Asamoah Gyan, Daniel Amartey, Mubarak Wakaso and André Ayew were some of the players that led the team to a historic run. 19 January 2015, the Black Stars started the tournament with a loss against Senegal, with the final score of 1–2. However, the team managed to beat Algeria by 1-0 - 23 January - and South Africa by 1-2 - 27 January. With those results, Ghana advanced to the knockout stage in first position and was scheduled to face Guinea on 1 February 2015 at Nuevo Estadio de Malabo.

The Black Stars were able to comfortably defeat Guinea 3–0 with a brace of Atsu and a goal of former Crystal Palace striker, Kwesi Appiah. On 5 February 2015, Ghana played Equatorial Guinea for a place to the final. The match was disputed at Nuevo Estadio de Malabo and the final score was a 3–0 victory with goals of J.Ayew, M. Wakaso and A. Ayew. With this result, Nus was able to make history and play his first ever Africa Cup of Nations Final. During the semi-final fixture between host nation of Equatorial Guinea and Ghana, several incidents occurred between the home fans, visiting fans and police. At half-time, the Ghanaian players and coaching staff were protected from hostile Equatoguinean fans by police, using plastic armors and shields. In addition, fans rushed onto the pitch at the 82nd minute in the second half, fans rushed onto the pitch and missiles were thrown at the Ghanaian substitute players. A helicopter was dispatched to disperse spectators out of the stadium.

On 8 February 2015, the match ended goalless. Following extra time and after a historical 9-8 penalty shoot-out, Ivory Coast defeated Ghana. Everton FC player, Christian Atsu, was named Orange man of the Competition and received the Nissan Goal of the tournament. André Ayew ended as the Pepsi Highest scorer. Also, Kwesi Appiah finished as the Samsung Fair Player of the tournament. Nus’ team placed three players in the CAF Team of the tournament, right-back Harrison Afful, midfielder André Ayew and winger Christian Atsu. Once in Accra, its supporters welcomed the squad, and the country's leaders honored the coaching staff.

In addition to assisting the national team head coach, supervising the players’ performances and travelling around the different countries visiting their respective clubs, Nus also oversaw the development of the promising Black Stars and the future generations of the country. Between 8–22 March 2015, Nus travelled to Senegal to supervise the 20th edition of the biennial international youth football tournament, 2015 African U-20 Championship, organized by the Confederation of African Football (CAF) for players aged 20 and below. Once again, Ghana advanced to the semi-finals of the tournament and performed at a high level, losing in the semifinals, finishing third and qualifying for the 2015 FIFA U-20 World Cup.

After receiving multiple offers from different head coach positions, Nus’ decided to stay as Assistant coach of the Black Stars to compete at the 2017 Africa Cup of Nations, which was the 31st edition of the tournament, and was hosted by Gabon. This event was also part of the Africa Cup of Nations 60th Anniversary. Ghana was placed in Group D with Uganda, Egypt and Mali. Nus’ team advanced to the knockout stage, and was able to fight for a final spot with Cameroon. On February 2, although an amazing performance, the Black Stars were defeated 2-0 by the tournament winners, Cameroon; ending the competition on fourth position.
After more than two historical years with the Ghana National Team, Nus decided to not renew his contract with the country's federation, finishing this way a remarkable experience with one of the best African national teams.

Elche
On summer of 2015, Gerard Nus was appointed as a Technical Director of Elche CF – LaLiga team - and worked under the supervision of Mr. Ramon Planes (Sporting Director). This new role allowed Nus to continue with his position as assistant coach of the National team of Ghana. At Elche CF, Nus built a successful structure to link the youth teams with the first team, ensuring their abilities to perform at a high level. Also, he oversaw the training sessions of the first team, assisted in the scouting procedures and helped in the creation of the 15/16 squad. 
Elche CF finished the 14/15 campaign with enough points to remain in LaLiga. However, off the field issues and the important economic crisis that the club faced, forced the team to drop to a lower division. As a result, many important players decided to leave the club. However, with one of the lowest budgets of “Segunda División”, Elche CF was able to build a strong and competitive roster that fought to get into playoff positions during all season. Some of the players that were member of the 15/16 squad were left-back Álex Moreno, strikers Sergio León and Álvaro Giménez, attacking midfielder Javier Espinosa and center-back Armando Lozano.
In addition to the fabulous job that Planes and Nus were able to do under such challenging circumstances, the club's structure improved significantly with the creation of a specific area of sports performance and high-level detailed training, controlled and monitored by Nus. This new section of the club was designed to allow all the players of the club, from the academy teams to the development squad – under 23 -, to improve the fundamental areas of their game and monitor their constant progress.
On summer 2016, with the conclusion of the season and the consequent departure of the Chief Sports Director, Mr. Ramon Planes, to Rayo Vallecano of Madrid, Nus did not sign a new contract and moved to Madrid, where he was appointed as the new technical director of Rayo Vallecano of Madrid.

Rayo Vallecano
On Juliol 2016, Nus was hired by Rayo Vallecano of Madrid as Deputy Technical Director, to assist Sporting Director Mr. Ramon Planes, and with the role of Deputy Technical Director. At Rayo Vallecano of Madrid, Nus faced similar circumstances as in Elche CF, as the club was relegated to Segunda División after finishing 18th in the 2015-16 La Liga season. Rayo's first season back in Segunda Division was difficult, and the team ended in 12th position. At the start of the 2017–18 season, the club appointed David Cobeño as the new Sporting Director, with the consequent departure of Ramon Planes. 
With the club's goal to build a roster to return to La Liga, Nus decided to remain at the club and played an important role designing the 17/18 squad, with players such as Fran Beltrán, Roberto Trashorras, Óscar Trejo, Bebé, Adrián Embarba, Raúl de Tomás and Unai López. Rayo secured their return to La Liga with a 1–0 victory over Lugo on the 41st game of the season.

Rayo OKC
In August 2016, Nus was named Head Coach of Rayo Oklahoma City, football club owned by Rayo Vallecano of Madrid. The team based in Oklahoma City, joined the North American Soccer League – the second tier of the American soccer pyramid – beginning the 2016 season and played their home games at Yukon High School's Miller Stadium. Nus, took over after Alen Marcina left the team in the middle-bottom of the table, with 6 losses, 6 draws and only 6 wins; 18 points in 18 games. With Nus’ arrival to the team, the results improved tremendously and they were able to achieve the NASL Championship semifinal after an historical 10-game unbeaten run with 5 straight wins. 
Nus’ performance captivated many fans and football critics due to its attractive style of play and ability to create countless scoring opportunities. The team was recognized for its high pressing and its desire to win the ball as close to the opposition's half as possible. In addition, Nus’ team dominated the games with the control and possession of the ball. Greek striker Georgios Samaras, Ghanaian midfielder Derek Boateng, defenders Moises Hernández and Sebastien Ibeagha, attackers Michel Garbini and Sebastián Velásquez, were among the players that played an important role under Nus’ attacking and dynamic team.
On November 7, 2016, following the conclusion of the 2016 NASL playoffs, Nus stepped down and returned to Spain to continue his role as Technical Director for Rayo Oklahoma City’s parent club, Rayo Vallecano of Madrid. A few months later, the American club ceased operations due to the instability of the league.

Irtysh Pavlodar
On 21 December 2017, Gerard Nus was appointed as the new manager of Irtysh Pavlodar on a two-year contract. Created in 1965, the club was a founding member of the top league and had never relegated to lower levels. The team’s ambitions were to win the qualifying games of the UEFA Europa League to be able to play the group stage and to be competitive in the club’s 27th successive season at the Kazakhstan Premier League- the highest tier of football in Kazakhstan.
The 2018-19 season started with two great results for Nus’ team. On 11 March, Nus achieved his first victory in the competition against FC Atyrau by 2–1. Just a few days later, on 17 March, Irtysh accomplished his second win of the season by a final score of 2–1, against a very strong side, FC Aktobe. In addition to this historical start of the season, Nus qualified the team for the next round of the Kazakhstan cup. Although having one of the lowest budgets of the table,  
On 28 April 2018, despite the multiple great performances of the team and after remaining in the middle of the table, Nus and Irtysh Pavlodar FC announced that they had mutually agreed to part ways. The fans were shocked by the news.
Just a few months later, Gerard Nus was appointed as the Technical Director of AFC Eskilstuna (Allsvenskan, Swedish top-tier division).

AFC Eskilstuna
In December 2018, Nus became Technical Director of AFC Eskilstuna at the Allsvenskan League, top-tier division of Sweden. 
The club has previously been known under the names FC Café Opera and Väsby United before switching ownership and their identity again in 2012 to AFC United. During the 2016 season it was once again decided that they would switch their name, identity, as well as locality. Choosing to move to Eskilstuna, about 110 kilometers west of Stockholm, they are since known as AFC Eskilstuna.
Nus’ main goal was to oversee the development of the club and establish the key fundamentals of the team. In addition, Nus created a structure from the academy to the first team that improved not only the present but also the future of the club.

NorthEast United
On 25 August 2020, Nus was appointed as the new manager of Indian Super League side NorthEast United a professional football club based in Guwahati, Assam that competes in the top flight of Indian football. The club is owned and operated by Bollywood actor John Abraham. The club, known to have the lowest budget of the league, signed the Mauritian international Khassa Camara, Ghanaian striker Kwesi Appiah, Belgium defender Benjamin Lambot, Portuguese Luis Machado, Australian Dylan Fox and Guinean Idrissa Sylla. In addition, the club retained captain and midfielder, Federico Gallego.
With the appointment of the Spanish manager, the club was able to accomplish an historic 6-game unbeaten run and was able to remain in playoff positions for more than 8 fixtures. Nus’ team was recognized by its dynamic and energetic offense, its great defensive organization and its ability to score goals in many different ways. On December 22, the team created a season-record of 21 goal attempts in their game against Odisha FC. In addition, the team was able to defeat Mumbai City FC– owned by the Football City group - in their opening game of the 2020/21 season by 1–0, as Kwesi Appiah scored his first goal of the campaign.
Although having one of the best seasons of their history, NorthEast United FC parted ways with coach Gerard Nus after a tie against Bengaluru FC. After only 11 matches in charge and only 3 points away of the playoff positions, the fans pronounced their disappointment by expressing that they wanted the Spanish coach to remain as the club's coach. However, Khalid Jamil was named interim head coach for the rest of the season.

Others

Efficiency Match Sports 
Gerard Nus is the co-founder of Efficiency Match Sports, software designed to organize training sessions, manage teams, create animations, control data and scout players. It is available in all languages, on iPad and iPhone. More than 3,000 clubs and academies from all over the world are currently using it – FC Barcelona, RCD Espanyol, Elche CF, Paris Saint-Germain FC, Watford FC, etc.
The app is available on the AppStore and offers a 30-day trial. There are two versions: Standard and Pro, both of them can be financed weekly, monthly or annually.

TV3 
Nus has worked for the Catalan TV (Esports 3 / TV3), analysing the FC Barcelona games from LaLiga and the Champions League, assisting the well-known journalist, Lluís Canut. Esport 3 is a TV channel of Televisió de Cataalunya dedicated to sports programming. It includes live transmissions and sporting events, during prime-time on Mondays to Fridays and all weekend.

Managerial statistics

Managerial record

References

External links

1985 births
Living people
North American Soccer League coaches
Sportspeople from Tarragona
Spanish football managers
Spanish expatriate sportspeople in England
Association football coaches
Spanish expatriate sportspeople in South Korea
Brighton & Hove Albion F.C. non-playing staff
Liverpool F.C. non-playing staff
Spanish expatriate sportspeople in Kazakhstan
Spanish expatriate sportspeople in Greece
Spanish expatriate sportspeople in the United States
Spanish expatriate sportspeople in Australia
Rayo Vallecano non-playing staff
Spanish expatriate sportspeople in Sweden
Elche CF non-playing staff
Spanish expatriate sportspeople in India
Expatriate football managers in Kazakhstan
Expatriate soccer managers in the United States
Spanish expatriate football managers
NorthEast United FC managers
Expatriate football managers in India
Association football scouts